Richard Paul Scheid (born February 3, 1965) is an American former professional baseball pitcher. He played for the Houston Astros (1992) and Florida Marlins (1994–1995) of Major League Baseball (MLB).

Scheid attended Seton Hall University, where he played college baseball for the Pirates under head coach Mike Sheppard.  He was inducted into the Staten Island Sports Hall of Fame in 2020.

External links
, or Baseball Almanac
Retrosheet info page
Venezuelan Professional Baseball League statistics

1965 births
Living people
Albany-Colonie Yankees players
American expatriate baseball players in Canada
Birmingham Barons players
Caribes de Oriente players
American expatriate baseball players in Venezuela
Charlotte Knights players
Duluth-Superior Dukes players
Edmonton Trappers players
Florida Marlins players
Fort Lauderdale Yankees players
Houston Astros players
Iowa Cubs players
Major League Baseball pitchers
Oneonta Yankees players
Pittsfield Cubs players
Seton Hall University alumni
Sportspeople from Staten Island
Baseball players from New York City
Tucson Toros players
Vancouver Canadians players
Seton Hall Pirates baseball players